Christian Berge (born 19 July 1973) is a Norwegian former handball player and current coach of Kolstad Håndball.

Previously he was the coach of the Norwegian national team.

He played 63 matches and scored 251 goals for the Norwegian national team between 1997 and 2006.

References

External links

1973 births
Living people
Norwegian male handball players
Norwegian handball coaches
Sportspeople from Trondheim
Norwegian expatriate sportspeople in Denmark
Norwegian expatriate sportspeople in Germany
Handball-Bundesliga players
SG Flensburg-Handewitt players
Handball coaches of international teams